The Madison, Wisconsin, metropolitan area, also known as Greater Madison, is the metropolitan area surrounding the city of Madison, Wisconsin. Madison is the state capital of Wisconsin and is Wisconsin's second largest city (after Milwaukee), and the metropolitan area is also the state's second largest (after the Milwaukee metropolitan area).

The Madison, WI Metropolitan Statistical Area (MSA), as defined by the United States Office of Management and Budget, is the area consisting of Columbia, Dane, Green, and Iowa counties in Wisconsin, anchored by the city of Madison. As of the 2020 census, the MSA had a population of 680,796. The latest Census estimate as of July 1, 2019 puts the population at 664,865, making it the 89th largest in the United States. 

The Madison–Janesville–Beloit Combined Statistical Area (CSA) consists of the four counties in the Madison MSA as well as Rock County (Janesville–Beloit metropolitan area) and Sauk County (Baraboo micropolitan area). The CSA population as of the 2020 census was 910,246. The CSA's 2019 population estimate was 892,661, making it the 63rd largest in the United States.

Definitions
The Madison–Janesville–Beloit Combined Statistical Area (CSA) is made up of six counties. The statistical area includes two metropolitan areas and one micropolitan area.

 Metropolitan Statistical Areas (MSAs)
 Madison (Columbia, Dane, Green, and Iowa counties)
 Janesville–Beloit (Rock County)
 Micropolitan Statistical Areas (μSAs)
 Baraboo (Sauk County)

The CSA totals are the totals of all the counties listed above, regardless of whether they were included in the Combined Statistical Area at the time.

Communities
The following are the incorporated communities of the Madison–Janesville–Beloit Combined Statistical Area. Populations listed are 2019 estimates, except for cities over 10,000 are from the 2020 census.

Communities marked with an asterisk (*) are part of the Janesville–Beloit metropolitan statistical area (Rock County). Communities marked with a cross (†) are part of the Baraboo micropolitan statistical area (Sauk County). The remainder are part of the Madison metropolitan statistical area.

Cities with more than 50,000 inhabitants
 Madison (269,840)
 Janesville* (65,615)

Cities with 10,000 to 50,000 inhabitants

 Baraboo† (12,165)
 Beloit* (36,657)
 Fitchburg (29,609)
 Middleton (21,287)
 Monroe (10,661)
 Portage (10,581)
 Stoughton (13,173)
 Sun Prairie (35,967)
 Verona (14,030)

Cities with less than 10,000 inhabitants

 Brodhead (3,247)
 Columbus (5,120)
 Dodgeville (4,695)
 Edgerton* (5,631)
 Evansville* (5,440)
 Lodi (3,092)
 Milton* (5,627)
 Mineral Point (2,465)
 Monona (8,175)
 Reedsburg† (9,521)
 Wisconsin Dells† (partial) (2,992 total)

Villages with more than 10,000 inhabitants

 DeForest (10,691)
 Oregon (10,571)
 Waunakee (14,052)

Villages with less than 10,000 inhabitants

 Albany (993)
 Arena (827)
 Arlington (820)
 Avoca (623)
 Barneveld (1,251)
 Belleville (2,463)
 Black Earth (1,419)
 Blanchardville (partial) (791 total)
 Blue Mounds (986)
 Brooklyn (1,465)
 Browntown (276)
 Cambria (748)
 Cambridge (partial) (1,535 total)
 Cazenovia† (partial) (310 total)
 Clinton* (2,140)
 Cobb (449)
 Cottage Grove (7,143)
 Cross Plains (4,286)
 Dane (1,135)
 Deerfield (2,532)
 Doylestown (297)
 Fall River (1,741)
 Footville* (831)
 Friesland (345)
 Highland (826)
 Hollandale (275)
 Ironton† (252)
 La Valle† (361)
 Lake Delton† (2,987)
 Lime Ridge† (163)
 Livingston (partial) (634 total)
 Loganville† (298)
 Maple Bluff (1,311)
 Marshall (3,984)
 Mazomanie (1,696)
 Merrimac† (440)
 McFarland (9,031)
 Monticello (1,202)
 Montfort (partial) (688 total)
 Mount Horeb (7,534)
 New Glarus (2,151)
 North Freedom† (697)
 Orfordville* (1,498)
 Pardeeville (2,063)
 Plain† (766)
 Poynette (2,510)
 Prairie du Sac† (4,431)
 Randolph (partial) (1,747 total)
 Rewey (282)
 Ridgeway (630)
 Rio (1,039)
 Rock Springs† (360)
 Rockdale (216)
 Sauk City† (3,485)
 Shorewood Hills (2,169)
 Spring Green† (1,641)
 West Baraboo† (1,424)
 Windsor (7,644)
 Wyocena (725)

Census-designated places
 Bluffview†
 Hanover*
 Juda
 Lake Wisconsin

Towns

Columbia County

 Arlington
 Caledonia
 Columbus
 Courtland
 Dekorra
 Fort Winnebago
 Fountain Prairie
 Hampden
 Leeds
 Lewiston
 Lodi
 Lowville
 Marcellon
 Newport
 Otsego
 Pacific
 Randolph
 Scott
 Springvale
 West Point
 Wyocena

Dane County

 Albion
 Berry
 Black Earth
 Blooming Grove
 Blue Mounds
 Bristol
 Burke
 Christiana
 Cottage Grove
 Cross Plains
 Dane
 Deerfield
 Dunkirk
 Dunn
 Fitchburg
 Madison
 Mazomanie
 Medina
 Middleton
 Montrose
 Oregon
 Perry
 Pleasant Springs
 Primrose
 Roxbury
 Rutland
 Springdale
 Springfield
 Sun Prairie
 Vermont
 Verona
 Vienna
 Westport
 York

Green County

Adams
Albany
Brooklyn
Cadiz
Clarno
Decatur
Exeter
Jefferson
Jordan
Monroe
Mount Pleasant
New Glarus
Spring Grove
Sylvester
Washington
York

Iowa County

 Arena
 Brigham
 Clyde
 Dodgeville
 Eden
 Highland
 Linden
 Mifflin
 Mineral Point
 Moscow
 Pulaski
 Ridgeway
 Waldwick
 Wyoming

Rock County

Avon
Beloit
Bradford
Center
Clinton
Fulton
Harmony
Janesville
Johnstown
La Prairie
Lima
Magnolia
Milton
Newark
Plymouth
Porter
Rock
Spring Valley
Turtle
Union

Sauk County

Baraboo
Bear Creek
Dellona
Delton
Excelsior
Fairfield
Franklin
Freedom
Greenfield
Honey Creek
Ironton
La Valle
Merrimac
Prairie du Sac
Reedsburg
Spring Green
Sumpter
Troy
Washington
Westfield
Winfield
Woodland

Demographics
As of the census of 2000, there were 501,774 people, 202,687 households, and 121,171 families residing within the MSA. The racial makeup of the MSA was 90.26% White, 3.50% African American, 0.32% Native American, 2.99% Asian, 0.03% Pacific Islander, 1.27% from other races, and 1.63% from two or more races. Hispanic or Latino of any race were 3.05% of the population.

The median income for a household in the MSA was $45,602, and the median income for a family was $55,159. Males had a median income of $35,250 versus $26,322 for females. The per capita income for the MSA was $21,832.

See also
 Wisconsin census statistical areas

References

External links
 Greater Madison Chamber of Commerce

 
Geography of Dane County, Wisconsin
Geography of Columbia County, Wisconsin
Geography of Iowa County, Wisconsin
Geography of Green County, Wisconsin
Geography of Jefferson County, Wisconsin
Metropolitan areas of Wisconsin
Geography of Rock County, Wisconsin
Geography of Sauk County, Wisconsin